Saint Gondelbert, (also Gondelbertus, Gundebert, Gumbert, Gombert, Gondeberg) was the founder of the Benedictine Senones Abbey in the Rabodeau (:fr:Rabodeau) valley of the Vosges mountains around 650 AD, and its first abbot.  He died around 676.

The Benedictine monks of Senones Abbey preserve the tradition, dating from the eleventh century, that Gondelbert was the archbishop of Sens before he founded the abbey and that the abbey is named after the diocese of Sens (Senonis in Latin).

He is a Catholic saint and his feastday is 21 February.

References

External links
Saint Gondelbert, in stained glass Diocèse de Saint-Dié (Vosges)  
Saint Gondelbert, Fondateur de Senones Diocèse de Saint-Dié (Vosges)    

676 deaths
Bishops of Sens
7th-century Christian saints
Year of birth unknown
7th-century Frankish bishops